The Saudi International is an annual men's squash tournament held in Al Khobar, in Saudi Arabia in December. It was part of the PSA World Series, the highest level of men's professional squash competition. The tournament was sponsored by ATCO, the company of President Ziad Al-Turki also chairman of the PSA. The event was founded in 2005 and the last was held in 2009.

Past Results

References

External links
Official website
PSA Sausi International page

Squash tournaments
Sport in Saudi Arabia